Forest: Stay focused, be present, or simply Forest, is a productivity application developed by ShaoKan Pi and released on March 15, 2016. Forest is available as an app on iOS, iPadOS and Android, and is also available as a browser extension on the Chrome Web Store and Firefox Add-ons.

Reception 
Ashley Kemper from Common Sense Media gave Forest 4/5 stars, praising the app's "visual representation of time as a growing tree" as "creative and beautiful".

In May 2019, Nicole Gallucci from Mashable gave Forest a 4.5/5. Nicole praised the app for helping "users stay focused and unplug from their phones", but criticized the app's virtual coin awards for not being "very large unless you pay for in-app extras".

References 

2016 software
IOS software
Android (operating system) software